Sally Jane Sara AM, (born 2 March 1971 in Port Pirie, South Australia) is an Australian journalist and TV presenter.

Career
Sara's career began with  Outback Radio (2WEB) in Bourke, New South Wales. Sara then joined the Australian Broadcasting Corporation in the late 1990s with stints at Renmark, Adelaide, Melbourne and Canberra.

Sara was the ABC's Africa Correspondent from 2000 to 2005, the first woman to hold this post. She has also reported from Jakarta, the Middle East and London during the 2005 London Bombings. In February 2006, Sara became the presenter of the ABC's Landline. In September 2007, Sara was awarded the Elizabeth Neuffer Fellowship, that recognises women in Journalism, which entails study overseas. In November 2008 she took up the post as the ABC's South Asia Correspondent based in New Delhi, India.

From February to December 2011, Sara was based in Kabul as the ABC's Afghanistan correspondent which included numerous assignments in the field reporting on the war from both the Afghan and NATO sides of the conflict. Sara spent one year covering the war in Afghanistan.  She reported from the frontline, entrenched with coalition forces. Sara has covered terrorist attacks, political unrest and followed the rebuilding of the country. 
Despite many restrictions on the activities of women in Afghanistan, Sara said she never faced a situation where she was denied interviews with officials or religious leaders. She was permitted entrance to the private homes of women – forbidden to male reporters – which allowed her more access in her role as a foreign correspondent. In a society segregated by gender, Sara said that being a female reporter allowed her 'to have access to women to be able to tell their stories – and that's really important. In a place like Afghanistan women and children make up almost three quarters of the population so it's crucial that their voices are heard.' After almost twelve years as a foreign correspondent, Sara returned to Australia from Afghanistan to become the ABC's regional and rural affairs correspondent. In August 2013, Sara joined the long running ABC program, Foreign Correspondent.

She has reported from more than 30 countries including Iraq, Afghanistan, Lebanon, Sierra Leone, Sudan, Zimbabwe, South Africa.

In October 2016, the ABC announced that Sara was returning to Africa as the broadcaster's Africa Correspondent based in Nairobi, Kenya.

Currently, Sara presents The World Today, a weekday Radio Current Affairs program on ABC Radio.

Awards

Sara has won many awards in her career including a UN Media Peace Award and was named South Australian Young Journalist of the Year and won the British Prize for Journalism. Sara won three awards in the Dalgety Awards for Excellence in Rural Journalism in 1993 and won the John Douglas Pringle Award in 1999.

Sara has been a finalist in the Walkley Awards for Excellence in Journalism six times and in 2017 she won a Walkley for her report on famine in Somaliland. and in 2010, her book Gogo Mama was nominated for the best-non fiction book in the Walkley Awards.

In March 2011, her story on the Pakistan Floods was nominated for a Logie Award, for Most Outstanding News Coverage. In April 2011, Sara was awarded the Silver Medal at the New York Festivals Television and Film Awards Gala at the NAB Show in Las Vegas for her story "Standing on the Sky". In September 2012, Sara was named as an Ochberg Fellow at the Dart Centre at Columbia University in New York.

In October 2016, Sara was named as a finalist for the 6th AACTA awards for her story on #blacklivesmatter.

Sara was also recognised by St Mark's College as a Distinguished Collegian in 2012.

Sara was made a Member of the Order of Australia on 26 January 2011, for service to journalism and the community.

Publications

Sara wrote a chapter in the book South Africa Lesotho & Swaziland by Mary Fitzpatrick. Sara has also written a chapter in the book "Travellers' Tales Stories from ABC TV's Foreign Correspondents" which was published in 2004 which includes insights from the ABC TV's Foreign Correspondent show.

Sara is the author of the book Gogo Mama, which tells the diverse stories of 12 women from different African countries.

In February 2013, Sara released the first of a 12 part online series called Mama Asia on www.abc.net.au. Gogo Mama inspired "The Mama Asia" project. She spent a week with most of the women featured in the project, getting to know them and their families. The show initially began as a book, which soon developed into a television series so that it could include photography and audio. It is a long-form journalism series. Sara interviewed an Afghan helicopter pilot, a pioneering Thai Buddhist monk, South Korean leprosy sufferer, a sheep shearer from beyond the Gobi Desert, a matriarch from the slums of Mumbai and a survivor of the Hiroshima atomic bomb. They tell their life stories of courage, hardship and resilience. The women's stories will be published each month beginning from February 2013 to December 2013.

Playwright
In 2021, Sara's first play - Stop Girl - premiered at the Belvoir Street Theatre in Sydney

References

External links
 Past ABC stories search.abc.net.au

Australian television journalists
Living people
1971 births
Women war correspondents
People educated at Pembroke School, Adelaide
Members of the Order of Australia
ABC News (Australia) presenters
Australian radio journalists
Australian war correspondents
ABC radio (Australia) journalists and presenters
Australian women television journalists
Women radio journalists